Zubof Rock (also known as Zuboff Rock) is a small island near Sitka, Alaska, United States, off the northeast coast of Baranof Island. Located in an area of Kelp Bay known as The Basin, it was entered into the United States Geological Survey's Geographic Names Information System on March 31, 1981. Its name dates back to 1895 as Zuboff, which was a Russian surname, as reported by Lieutenant Commander J. F. Moser of the United States Navy.

References

Islands of the Alexander Archipelago
Landforms of Sitka, Alaska
Uninhabited islands of Alaska